Gabriel Cañellas Fons (born 1941 in Palma, Majorca) is a Spanish politician. He was President of the Balearic Islands from 1983 to 1995.

References 

Living people
1941 births
Presidents of the Balearic Islands
Members of the Parliament of the Balearic Islands